Şazi Tezcan (1907 – 1962) was a Turkish football player and referee. He became Turkey's first referee to officiate an international match, and became a FIFA referee in 1948.

Playing career 
Born in 1907 in Constantinople (modern-day Istanbul), Tezcan played as a goalkeeper for Darüşşafaka, Kasımpaşa, and Beykoz. He was also a physical education teacher at the Commercial High School. In 1928 Tezcan broke his arm, and was unable to continue playing football and working as a teacher.

Refereeing career 
In 1932, Tezcan attended the Turkish Football Federation's first training courses for referees, obtaining his diploma and starting his refereeing career. On 28 November 1937, Tezcan officiated a match at the Taksim Stadium between Fenerbahçe and Greek side AEK, which ended in a 3–2 win for AEK. Tezcan expelled Esad'ı of Fenerbahçe, despite yellow and red cards not existing at the time; the referee was punished with a lifetime ban. The Istanbul District Disciplinary Board overturned the decision on 5 March 1938.

On 1 October 1940, a new law was enacted in Turkey where referees were officially licensed: Tezcan was given the first "national referee" license. On 4 May 1947, Tezcan refereed an international game between Lebanon and Syria at the Beirut Municipal Stadium, becoming the first Turkish referee to officiate a match between two international sides. He became a FIFA referee in 1948, earning the FIFA badge.

Death 
Tezcan died in 1962.

References

External links
 

1907 births
1962 deaths
Footballers from Istanbul
Sportspeople from Istanbul
Turkish footballers
Association football goalkeepers
Turkish football referees